Vir is a village in the municipality of Nikšić, Montenegro. It is located north to the city of Nikšić.

Demographics
According to the 2011 census, its population was 810.

References

Populated places in Nikšić Municipality